The miombo tit (Melaniparus griseiventris) is a species of bird in the family Paridae.
It is found in Angola, Democratic Republic of the Congo, Malawi, Mozambique, Tanzania, Zambia, and Zimbabwe.
Its natural habitat is subtropical or tropical dry forests.

The miombo tit was formerly one of many species in the genus Parus but was moved to Melaniparus after a molecular phylogenetic analysis published in 2013 showed that the members of the new genus formed a distinct clade.

References

External links
 (Miombo tit = ) northern grey tit - Species text in The Atlas of Southern African Birds.

miombo tit
Birds of Southern Africa
miombo tit
Taxonomy articles created by Polbot